Ernest P. "Ernie" Kline (June 20, 1929 – May 13, 2009) was a Democratic member of the Pennsylvania State Senate and the 25th lieutenant governor of Pennsylvania, serving from 1971 to 1979.

Early life, career

Kline was born in Allentown, Pennsylvania and grew up in the Webster neighborhood of Rostraver Township, Pennsylvania. He attended Rostraver High School, where he was the starting quarterback and graduated in 1947. He attended Duquesne University, but was unable to afford completing his degree. He took a career in radio news broadcasting in Charleroi, Connellsville, Kittanning, and at WBVP-AM in Beaver Falls. He entered politics after covering city council; he was elected to the Beaver Falls City Council in 1955.  In 1961, he was appointed to be a workers' compensation referee for Beaver, Washington, and Greene Counties.

Politics

He was elected to the Pennsylvania State Senate in 1964, taking office in 1965. In August 1967, he was elected Democratic Floor Leader, becoming the youngest person to hold that position.

He was elected Lieutenant Governor of Pennsylvania on the Milton Shapp gubernatorial ticket in November 1970. As a Western Pennsylvanian, Kline provided balance to the Democratic ticket, which had Philadelphian Milton Shapp. Kline held that position from 1971 to 1979. He was the first Lieutenant Governor to live in State House, the Lieutenant Governor's official residence.

He served as a delegate to the Democratic National Convention in 1972 and 2000. He is credited for taking steps to establish the Governor's Energy Council during the 1973 oil crisis and for leading the Pennsylvania Emergency Management Agency. He ran for the Democratic nomination for governor in 1978, but lost a highly contested primary to Peter Flaherty, who eventually lost to Dick Thornburgh.

Later life and death

Kline retired from political life after his stint as lieutenant governor and served as a lobbyist.  He lived in Palmyra, Pennsylvania until his death in 2009 at the age of 79.

References

External links
Pennsylvania State Archives

 

1929 births
2009 deaths
American radio reporters and correspondents
Duquesne University alumni
Pennsylvania lobbyists
Lieutenant Governors of Pennsylvania
Politicians from Allentown, Pennsylvania
People from Westmoreland County, Pennsylvania
People from Lebanon County, Pennsylvania
Democratic Party Pennsylvania state senators
20th-century American politicians
People from Beaver Falls, Pennsylvania